The Nokia E63 is a budget business smartphone, announced on 12 November 2008 and released later that year. It is based on Symbian's S60 platform. Although it looks very similar to Nokia E71, its fascia is made of plastic and not aluminium as in E71 (both have plastic chassis). Also its keypad is made from a different material and is laid out slightly different from that of the E71. Many of the specifications are identical to the E71 except for the lack of GPS and infrared, lesser RAM, lack of HSDPA and lower-quality camera with a fixed-focus lens. The E63 does come with the ability to use the camera flash as a light, which is not present in the E71. It also has a standard 3.5 mm audio jack where the E71 uses a 2.52 mm jack. The E63 retailed for about 199 euros before taxes. The device was discontinued in late 2011 in favour of Nokia's Lumia Lineup. 

Specifications:

Form: Monoblock with full Qwerty keyboard
Dimensions: 113 × 59 × 13 mm, Weight: 126g, Volume: 87 cc
Display: 320 × 240 px, Size 2.36", Colors 16 million
Operating system: Symbian OS9.2, S60 3.1 Edition
Data: CSD, HSCSD, GPRS class 32, EDGE class 32, 3G 384/384 kbit/s, WLAN IEEE 802.11b/g, TCP/IP support
Connectivity: Micro-USB connector, 3.5 mm Audio jack, Bluetooth 2.0, WiFi
Memory: Phone ~100 MB free, MicroSD card up to 16 GB verified (32 GB unofficial)
Software: PDF viewer, Quick office with MS Office 2007 support (Word / Excel / Powerpoint editor)
Camera: 2MP fixed-focus flash, video recording @ 320x240px

Current firmware version: 510.21.010 released on 28 March 2011

Operating frequency:

E63-1 Quad-band EGSM 850/900/1800/1900, WCDMA 900/2100
E63-2 Quad-band EGSM 850/900/1800/1900, WCDMA 850/1900
E63-3 Quad-band EGSM 850/900/1800/1900, WCDMA 850/2100

See also 
 Nokia Eseries
 List of Nokia products

External links 
 Nokia E63 product page 
 Forum Nokia E63 technical device details

References 

 http://europe.nokia.com/support/product-support/e63

Nokia ESeries
Mobile phones with user-replaceable battery